The women's team tournament of the 2017 European Table Tennis Championships was held from 13 September to 17 September 2017.

All times are local (UTC+1)

Medalists

Championship division
The top two teams of each group advanced.

Preliminary round

Group A

Group B

Group C

Group D

Knockout stage

Places 1–8

5th place bracket

Quarterfinals

5th-7th place

Semifinals

7th place

5th place

Final

Places 9–16

5th place bracket

Quarterfinals

13th-15th place

Semifinals

15th place

13th place

11th place

9th place

Challenge Division

Preliminary round

Group E

Group F

Group G

Group H

Knockout stage

Places 25–32

Quarterfinals

Semifinals

Final

Places 17–24

Quarterfinals

Semifinals

Final

Standard Division

References

External links
Official website

Women's team
Euro
Table